The 2018 CONCACAF Women's U-20 Championship qualification is a women's under-20 football competition which decides the participating teams of the 2018 CONCACAF Women's U-20 Championship. A total of eight teams will play in the final tournament. Players born on or after 1 January 1998 are eligible to compete in the tournament.

Teams
A total of 23 (out of 41) CONCACAF member national teams entered, with four automatic qualifiers, and the remaining 19 teams entering regional qualification tournaments.

Notes
Teams in bold qualified for the final tournament.

Central American zone

In the Central American Zone, six UNCAF member national teams entered the qualifying competition, hosted by Nicaragua. In the group stage, the six teams were divided into two groups of three teams. The top two teams of each group advance to the classification stage, where the winners of one group play the runners-up of the other group, with the two winners qualifying for the final tournament as the UNCAF representatives.

The schedule of the qualifying competition was announced on 17 May 2017. All times local, UTC−6.

Group stage

Group A

Group B

Classification stage
Winners qualify for 2018 CONCACAF Women's U-20 Championship.

Goalscorers
7 goals

 Fabiola Villalobos

3 goals

 Daniela Coto

2 goals

 Mariela Campos
 Amaya González
 Maggi Segovia
 Fátima Romero
 Alys Cruz
 Yessenia Flores

1 goal

 Jada Brown
 Priscila Chinchilla
 María Paula Coto
 María Paula Elizondo
 Indira González
 María Paula Salas
 Gloriana Villalobos
 Brenda Cerén
 Mara Rodríguez
 Kendra Haylock
 Sheyla Flores
 Shanelly Treminio
 Liz Vega

Caribbean zone

In the Caribbean Zone, 13 CFU member national teams entered the qualifying competition, consisting of two stages. Apart from Saint Kitts and Nevis, which received a bye as hosts of the final round, the remaining 12 teams entered the first round, and were drawn into three groups of four teams. The winners of each group advance to the final round to join Saint Kitts and Nevis, where they are placed into one group, with the top two teams qualifying for the final tournament as the CFU representatives together with Trinidad and Tobago who qualified automatically as hosts.

The draw of the qualifying competition was held on 5 June 2017, 10:00 UTC−4, at the CONCACAF headquarters in Miami Beach, Florida. Haiti, Bermuda, and Dominican Republic were automatically seeded in Groups A–C respectively as hosts of each first round group, while the remaining nine teams were seeded based on the results of the previous two editions of the qualifying competition.

All times local, UTC−4, except Group B which is UTC−3.

First round

Group A

Group B

Group C

Final round

Qualified teams
The following eight teams qualified for the final tournament.

1 Bold indicates champions for that year. Italic indicates hosts for that year.

References

External links
Under 20s – Women, CONCACAF.com
Fútbol Femenino Sub-20, UNCAFut.com 
Women's U20, CFUfootball.org

Qualification
2018
Women's U-20 Championship qualification
2017 in women's association football
2017 in youth association football
June 2017 sports events in North America
July 2017 sports events in North America
November 2017 sports events in North America